Manik Gupta (born 16 December 1990) is an Indian first-class cricketer who plays for Jammu and Kashmir. He made his Twenty20 debut for Jammu and Kashmir in the 2016–17 Inter State Twenty-20 Tournament on 29 January 2017.

References

External links
 

1990 births
Living people
Indian cricketers
Jammu and Kashmir cricketers
People from Jammu